Phoxocampus belcheri, also known as the rock pipefish, is a species of marine fish belonging to the family Syngnathidae. The species can be found in shallow reefs and tide pools throughout much of the Indo-Pacific ranging from the eastern coast of Africa and the Red Sea to Tonga and Japan. Its diet likely consists of small crustaceans such as copepods. Reproduction occurs through ovoviviparity in which the males brood eggs before giving live birth.

References

External links 

 Phoxocampus belcheri at FishBase
 Phoxocampus belcheri at Fishes of Australia

Syngnathidae
Taxa named by Johann Jakob Kaup
Fish described in 1856